Maldon and East Chelmsford was a parliamentary constituency represented in the House of Commons of the Parliament of the United Kingdom. From 1997 to 2010 it elected one Member of Parliament (MP) by the first past the post system of election.

History 
This seat was created for the 1997 general election from parts of the abolished constituencies of South Colchester and Maldon and Chelmsford. It was abolished at the next redistribution which came into effect for the 2010 general election, when the Chelmsford and Maldon constituencies were re-established.

It was a safe Conservative seat throughout its existence.

Boundaries
The District of Maldon, and the Borough of Chelmsford wards of Baddow Road and Great Baddow Village, Galleywood, Little Baddow, Danbury and Sandon, Rothmans, and Woodham Ferrers and Bicknacre.

The constituency was formed from the bulk of the abolished South Colchester and Maldon constituency (the District of Maldon) and eastern parts of the abolished county constituency of Chelmsford, including eastern suburbs of the City of Chelmsford (Great Baddow and Galleywood).

Following their review into parliamentary representation in Essex, the Boundary Commission for England abolished the Maldon and East Chelmsford constituency for the 2010 general election. The majority of the constituency, including Maldon and Burnham-on-Crouch, was incorporated into the re-established County Constituency of Maldon; northern areas were added to the new County Constituency of Witham; and the Chelmsford suburbs of Great Baddow and Galleywood were included in the re-established constituency of Chelmsford (now a Borough Constituency). For the first time, Maldon District was split between constituencies.

Members of Parliament

Elections

See also
List of parliamentary constituencies in Essex

Notes and references

Parliamentary constituencies in Essex (historic)
Constituencies of the Parliament of the United Kingdom established in 1997
Constituencies of the Parliament of the United Kingdom disestablished in 2010
Politics of Maldon District
Politics of the City of Chelmsford